The Wolcott House is a historic house in Mission Hills, Kansas, U.S.. It was built in 1928 for John J. Wolcott, a grain dealer, and his wife Wynnogene (also known as Daisy). It was designed by architect Selby Kurfiss in the Tudor Revival style, with elements of French electricism. In 1939, it was purchased by Louis S. Myers, the vice president and treasurer of the Rodney Milling Company. By 1951, it was purchased by Samuel Sosland, the editor of Southwestern Miller. It was then purchased by David W. Gibson, the president of the Wolcott-Lincoln Company, in 1984, followed by Mark A. Morgan in 1997, and Michael Coughlin in 1999. It has been listed on the National Register of Historic Places since May 2, 2001.

References

Houses on the National Register of Historic Places in Kansas
Tudor Revival architecture in the United States
Houses completed in 1928
Houses in Johnson County, Kansas